Shirley Bunnie Foy (60th Anniversary) is an album of American singer Shirley Bunnie Foy issued by MAP Golden Jazz label, June 2013.

Description 
The album is, a tribute dedicated to jazz vocalist Shirley Bunnie Foy on occasion of her 60-year career anniversary, consists of 17 tracks recorded by the singer from 1954 to 2009 and features such noted artists as The Dell-Tones, Tony Scott, Archie Shepp, Franco Cerri, Pino Presti, Lou Bennett, Pierre Franzino, among others.

Track listing

Credits

Musicians
 Shirley Bunnie Foy: Vocals, Percussion

Guests 
 The Dell-Tones (track 1)
 Lou Bennett (tracks 2, 5, 11)
 Tony Scott (tracks 3, 4, 9, 10)
 Sonny Taylor (tracks 6, 16, 17)
 Anthony Ange Franzino (tracks 6, 17)
 Pierre Franzino (Track 7)
 Franco Cerri (tracks 9, 10)
 Stefano Cerri (tracks 9, 10)
 Sante Palumbo (tracks 8, 9)
 Archie Shepp (track 12)
 Pino Presti (track 13)
 Nicolas Viccaro (track 13)
 Josh Fabris (track 13)
 Jean Sébastien Simonoviez (track 15)

More credits 
 Producer: Pino Presti & Mad Of Jazz, Claudio Citarella
 Sound engineer: Thierry Scheffer
 Remastering: Pino Presti and Thierry Scheffer  (April/May 2013)
 Artwork: Daniele Muratori

References

External links 
 Google Play
 iTunes-Apple
 Spotify
 Amazon.co.uk i

2013 albums
Jazz albums by American artists
Albums produced by Pino Presti